Volodymyr Stefanovych Biletskyy (born 26 January 1950 in Matvyivka, Ukraine) is a Ukrainian mining engineer, D.Sc. scientist and researcher in the field of coal mining, publisher and political scientist. He has published many technical articles on the subject of mining, and was the initiator and editor of the first Ukrainian Mining Encyclopedia.

Biography 

Biletskyy finished Vilniansk high school in 1967 and then studied at the electro-technical faculty of the National Mining University of Ukraine. Graduating in 1972, he worked as an engineer in the research department of the faculty of automation of manufacturing processes at the same university (1974–1975). Between 1975 and 1976 he worked as the chief engineer at the coal mine operated by the State Coal Enterprise in Makiivka, and then as a research assistant in the electrical department of the Makiivka Research Institute, researching safety in mining production (1977–1979). In 1981 Biletskyy then became the head research assistant at the Donetsk National Technical University.

In 1986 Biletsky finished post-graduate studies; in 1994 he completed his Doctorate in Technical Science and in 2004 he was elected as an academic to the Academy of Economic Sciences of Ukraine (a public-funded research institution part of the National Academy of Sciences of Ukraine); in 2005 became a Corresponding Member of this institute.

From 2006 he was professor in the faculty of Mineral processing at the Donetsk National Technical University. In 2012 Biletskyy became Academician at the Academy of Mining Sciences of Ukraine. From 2014 he is a professor at the Poltava National Technical Yuriy Kondratyuk University., from 2017 he is a professor at the Kharkiv Polytechnic Institute.

Scientific research and publishing 

Biletskyy was the science editor of the Mining Encyclopedia (1998–2013), which contributed to creating a nationally unified mining terminological system in Ukraine. He has freely donated the contents of this multiple-volume set to Wikipedia, and has incorporated it into thousands of articles covering mining and technology subjects in Ukrainian Wikipedia.

He has published over 450 academic papers, including more than 30 books (monographs, course books, dictionaries and encyclopedias). He is also the author of over 200 articles in popular science and science magazines. He is a founder and editor-in-chief of the national scientific and informational-analytical magazine Skhid (since 1995 an academic periodical on philosophy, history and economics); the founder and co-editor of the Donetsk Herald of Shevchenko Scientific Society.

A regular contributor to the Ukrainian Wikipedia, by 2015 Biletskyy had created more than 17,000 articles and performed more than 94,000 edits on Wikipedia.

Biletskyy is the owner of 60 patents regarding various processing and transporting technologies in Ukraine and Russia.

Public activities 

Originally a member of the Communist Party of Ukraine (1975–1990), Biletskyy later became one of the co-founders of the People's Movement of Ukraine (Rukh) in Donbas. Biletskyy left Rukh in 1997. In 1997–2012, Biletskyy was consultant to the Deputies of Verkhovna Rada (Ukrainian Parliament), O.V. Kulyk, Ivan Drach, and O.I. Klymenko.

Biletskyy is a co-founder and head of the Donetsk branch of Shevchenko Scientific Society (1997), the Donetsk branch of Ukrajina-Svit Association (1997), the Donetsk Regional Association of the Ukrainian language (1989). He heads the research and editing foundation Ukrainian Centre of Culture Studies (Donetsk, Ukraine), which he founded in 1994, and is currently on the Consultative Council for Nationalities Questions at the Donetsk Region State Administration.

Volodymyr Biletskyy has received a number of awards and decorations for his publishing, political, social and cultural activities including an Order of Merit (Third Class) from the President of Ukraine, Viktor Yushchenko.

References

External links 

 Total number of articles created on Wikipedia by Volodymyr Biletskyy
 List of publications and curriculum vitae 
 Articles by "В. С. Білецький" via Google Scholar
 Books by "В. С. Білецький" via Google Books

Academic staff of Kharkiv Polytechnic Institute
Recipients of the Order of Merit (Ukraine), 3rd class
1950 births
Academic staff of Donetsk National Technical University
Dnipro Polytechnic alumni
People from Zaporizhzhia Oblast
Ukrainian inventors
Ukrainian publishers (people)
Ukrainian mining engineers
Academic journal editors
Ukrainian editors
Members of the Shevchenko Scientific Society
Living people
Soviet military personnel
Communist Party of Ukraine (Soviet Union) politicians
People's Movement of Ukraine politicians
Ukrainian mountain climbers
Wikipedia people
Ukrainian Wikimedians
Laureates of the Diploma of the Verkhovna Rada of Ukraine
Ukrainian encyclopedists